Pascal Maeder is a Swiss-Canadian film producer and cyberneticist.

In 2020, he launched x-ode, an XR messaging app enabling its users to connect with one another based on shared experiences in the real world. The app was developed by Urbanoid, a technology company founded by Maeder with hubs in Switzerland and Canada.

Maeder had previously founded Atopia, a film production company through which he produced and released several feature films including S.P.I.T.: Squeegee Punks In Traffic (2001), A Silent Love (2004) and Je me souviens (2009).

Maeder studied film production at Concordia University in the late 1980s before co-founding Dummies Theatre, an experimental and interdisciplinary theatre company known for creating free site-specific works in vacant stores in Montreal during the 1990s.

References

External links
 
 atopia.com archived website
 urbanoid.com website

1965 births
Living people
Film producers from Quebec
Concordia University alumni
People from Montreal